Royal Leerdam Crystal (also known as Royal Leerdam) was a Dutch producer of glassware products based in Leerdam, the Netherlands. It was established in 1878 as a department within a glassware producing factory, itself founded in 1765. From 1938 until 2002 it was part of the Schiedam-based Vereenigde Glasfabrieken. In 2002, the factory became part of the American glass and tableware company Libbey Inc. In 2008, Royal Leerdam was purchased by De Koninklijke Porceleyne Fles, becoming part of the Royal Delft Group. In September 2020, as a result of the COVID-19 pandemic, the glass-making facilities were shut.

Designing and glassblowing
Designing and glassblowing were in the past strictly separated. Several well-known designers as Hendrik Petrus Berlage, Andries Copier, Sybren Valkema, and Willem Heesen have contributed to the Royal Leerdam reputation with a wide range of designer glassware.. Best known has become the so-called range of products Gilde Glass (1930) by Andries Copier, as an example of both simplicity and beauty.
Glass art created by Royal Leerdam Crystal was and still is very sought after by museums and collectors worldwide.

Museums
 Nationaal Glasmuseum in Leerdam
 Museum van der Togt in Amstelveen
 Museum Boymans-van Beuningen in Rotterdam

See also
Glass art

In popular culture
The factory of Royal Leerdam Crystal was featured in the 1958 short documentary film Glass by Bert Haanstra. The documentary won an Academy Award for Documentary Short Subject in 1959.

References

External links
 
 

Glassmaking companies
Dutch culture
Dutch brands
Companies based in South Holland
Companies that filed for Chapter 11 bankruptcy in 2020